The second season of the American television drama series Scandal, created by Shonda Rhimes, began on September 27, 2012,  in the United States, on ABC, and consisted of 22 episodes. The season was produced by ABC Studios, in association with ShondaLand Production Company; the showrunner being Shonda Rhimes. The program airs at the same time in Canada through the City television system with simsubbing of the ABC feed.

The season continues the story of Olivia Pope's crisis management firm, Olivia Pope & Associates, and its staff, as well as staff at the White House in Washington, D.C. Season two had nine series regulars, all returning from the previous season, out of which seven are part of the original cast of eight regulars from the first season. The season aired in the Thursday 10:00 pm time slot, the same as the previous season.

Plot 
The season has two arcs. The first arc focuses on Fitz's attempted assassination in addition to the election-rigging, of which, more information is revealed through flashbacks. James investigates Defiance and the election-rigging for Fitz's campaign. It's revealed through flashbacks that the rigging was done by Olivia, Cyrus, Mellie, Verna and Hollis at election campaign headquarters. James teams up with David to try to build a case to take down Cyrus and Fitz. However, James ultimately lies in court, covering for Cyrus.

An assassination attempt is made on Fitz's life, which almost kills him. As a result, Sally takes over as President, much to Cyrus' dismay. After surviving, Fitz decides to get a divorce, which Mellie tries to avoid by somehow convincing her OB/GYN to induce her labour 4 weeks early.  Huck is arrested for the attempted assassination after being framed by his girlfriend Becky. After David helps Huck go free, Huck, Olivia and her team trick Becky to show up at the hospital where she is arrested. Fitz finds out that Verna was behind the assassination and kills her. At the funeral, he reveals to Olivia that he doesn't want a divorce as he is devastated after learning about the rigging from Verna. 

The second arc focuses on finding the mole who is leaking classified information from the White House. Olivia and the team investigate the case after figuring out that the CIA Director's suicide was actually a murder. Olivia gets to know Captain Jake Ballard, who works with the leader of B613, Rowan, who orders Jake to get close to Olivia. At the end of the season, Mellie gives Fitz an ultimatum, either he becomes loyal to her, or she goes on national television and reveals Fitz's affair with Olivia. Fitz chooses Olivia, which makes Mellie reveal the affair. Fitz announces his re-election campaign.

As Olivia and the team continue to investigate who the mole is, Huck manages to capture Charlie, who reveals the mole's identity: Billy Chambers. They figure out that Billy is working with David, who steals the Cytron card, but frames Billy and gives Cyrus the card in exchange for being reinstated as US Attorney. At the end, Olivia's name is leaked to the press as being Fitz's mistress, and it is revealed that Rowan is Olivia's father.

Cast and characters

The second season had nine roles receiving star billing, with all of them returning from the previous season, seven of which part of the original cast from the first season. Kerry Washington continued her role as protagonist of the series, Olivia Pope, a former White House Director of Communications with her own crisis management firm. Columbus Short played the character Harrison Wright, while Darby Stanchfield played Abby Whelan, who begins a relationship with David Rosen. Katie Lowes acted as Quinn Perkins who is on trial for murder at the beginning of the season, and Guillermo Diaz continued playing the character Huck, the troubled tech guy who works for Olivia. Jeff Perry played Cyrus Beene, the Chief of Staff at the White House. Joshua Malina played David Rosen, the U.S. Attorney who develops a relationship with Abby. Bellamy Young continued playing First Lady Melody "Mellie" Grant, and Fitz's Vice President nominee, while Tony Goldwyn portrayed President Fitzgerald "Fitz" Thomas Grant III. 

Several casting changes occurred for the second season. Henry Ian Cusick exited the show and did not return as his character Stephen Finch for the second season as the actor and showrunner Shonda Rhimes came to the mutual decision for him not to come back for the second year. Both Bellamy Young, as First Lady of the United States, and Joshua Malina, as David Rosen, were bumped up to series regulars.

Main

 Kerry Washington as Olivia Pope 
 Columbus Short as Harrison Wright 
 Darby Stanchfield as Abigail "Abby" Whelan 
 Katie Lowes as Quinn Perkins 
 Guillermo Diaz as Huck
 Jeff Perry as White House Chief of Staff Cyrus Beene 
 Joshua Malina as David Rosen
 Bellamy Young as First Lady Melody "Mellie" Grant 
 Tony Goldwyn as President Fitzgerald "Fitz" Thomas Grant III

Recurring
 Gregg Henry as Hollis Doyle 
 Dan Bucatinsky as James Novak 
 Debra Mooney as Supreme Court Justice Verna Thornton 
 Norm Lewis as Senator Edison Davis 
 George Newbern as Charlie 
 Scott Foley as Jacob "Jake" Ballard 
 Kate Burton as Vice President Sally Langston 
Susan Pourfar as Becky Flynn 
 Joe Morton as Rowan "Eli" Pope 
 Sharmila Devar as Lauren Wellman 
Brian Letscher as Tom Larsen
 Samantha Sloyan as Jeannine Locke
 Kurt Fuller as CIA Director Grayden Osborne 
 Brenda Song as Alissa 
 Tom Amandes as Governor Samuel Reston 
 Erica Shaffer as News Reporter 
 Matt Letscher as Billy Chambers

Guest stars
 Jimmy Kimmel as himself
 Lorraine Toussaint as Nancy Drake
 Elise Neal as Anna Gordon
 Patrick Fischler as Arthur "Artie" Hornbacher
 Brenda Strong as Joan Reston
 Sam Anderson as Melvin Feen
 Barry Bostwick as Fitzgerald Grant II
 Eric Mabius as Peter Caldwell
 Lisa Edelstein as Sarah Stanner
 Melinda McGraw as Debora Clarkson
 Andrea Bowen as Maybelle Doyle
 John Barrowman as a fixer

Episodes

<onlyinclude>{{Episode table |background=#6B4423 |overall=5 |season=5 |title=26 |director=14 |writer=23 |airdate=13 |prodcode=5 |viewers=9 |country=U.S. |episodes=

{{Episode list/sublist|Scandal (season 2)
 |EpisodeNumber   = 9
 |EpisodeNumber2  = 2
 |Title           = The Other Woman
 |DirectedBy      = Stephen Cragg
 |WrittenBy       = Heather Mitchell
 |OriginalAirDate = 
 |ProdCode        = 202
 |Viewers         = 6.56<ref name="ep2x02">{{Cite web|url=http://tvbythenumbers.zap2it.com/2012/10/05/thursday-final-ratingsthe-x-factor-last-resort-30-rock-greys-anatomy-the-office-adjusted-up-two-and-a-half-men-person-of-interest-scandal-elementary/151704/|title=Thursday Final Ratings:'The X Factor', 'Last Resort', '30 Rock', 'Grey's Anatomy', 'The Office' Adjusted Up; Two and a Half Men', 'Person of Interest', 'Scandal', 'Elementary' 'Rock Center' & 'The Next' Adjusted Down|work=TV by the Numbers|last=Bibel|first=Sara|date=October 5, 2012|accessdate=October 6, 2012|archive-url=https://web.archive.org/web/20121007175716/http://tvbythenumbers.zap2it.com/2012/10/05/thursday-final-ratingsthe-x-factor-last-resort-30-rock-greys-anatomy-the-office-adjusted-up-two-and-a-half-men-person-of-interest-scandal-elementary/151704/|archive-date=October 7, 2012|url-status=dead}}</ref>
 |ShortSummary    = Olivia has to deal with the ramifications of the jaw dropping verdict of Quinn’s court case, and Abby continues to press Olivia for answers. Meanwhile, in the White House, Cyrus and President Grant deal with a foreign policy emergency. However, Fitz becomes agitated when he realizes that his team is trying to force him to make hard decisions about foreign policy, so he seeks Olivia's help by calling her. 
 |LineColor       = 6B4423
}}

}}</onlyinclude>

Reception
The second season got overwhelmingly positive reviews, with some calling the season a triumph. Ratings grew significantly over the second season, reaching a series high with the season finale which increased 25% in Total Viewers and 39% in Adult 18-49 compared to the first season's finale. The review aggregator website Rotten Tomatoes reports a 92% approval rating with an average rating of 9.2/10 based on 13 reviews. The website's consensus reads, "Owning its soap-like sensibilities, Scandal'' creates enticingly addictive narratives, with surprising twists and fascinatingly damaged characters."

Ratings

Live + SD ratings

Live + 7 Day (DVR) ratings

Awards and nominations

DVD release

References

External links

2012 American television seasons
2013 American television seasons
Season 2